Taibai may refer to:

Taibai County (太白县), of Baoji, Shaanxi
Li Bai (701-762), style name Taibai, Chinese poet
Mount Taibai, mountain peak in Shaanxi Province.
Towns (太白镇)
Taibai, Dangtu County, in Dangtu County, Anhui
Taibai, Suiyang County, in Suiyang County, Guizhou
Taibai, Wuyuan County, Jiangxi, in Wuyuan County, Jiangxi